Walter Alejandro Vargas Alzate (born 16 April 1992) is a Colombian professional racing cyclist, who currently rides for UCI Continental team . He won the Colombian National Time Trial Championships in 2016.

Major results

2016
 1st  Time trial, Pan American Road Championships
 1st  Time trial, National Road Championships
2017
 3rd Time trial, National Road Championships
 8th Overall Vuelta Ciclista de Chile
2018
 1st  Time trial, Pan American Road Championships
 2nd Time trial, Central American and Caribbean Games
 2nd Time trial, South American Games
 3rd Time trial, National Road Championships
2019
 1st  Overall Vuelta del Uruguay
1st Stage 6 (ITT)
 5th Time trial, National Road Championships
2021 
 1st  Time trial, Pan American Road Championships
 1st  Time trial, National Road Championships
2022
 1st  Time trial, Bolivarian Games
 4th Time trial, National Road Championships

References

External links
 

1992 births
Living people
Colombian male cyclists
Central American and Caribbean Games silver medalists for Colombia
Competitors at the 2018 Central American and Caribbean Games
Central American and Caribbean Games medalists in cycling
Sportspeople from Antioquia Department
21st-century Colombian people
Competitors at the 2018 South American Games
Competitors at the 2022 South American Games
South American Games gold medalists for Colombia
South American Games silver medalists for Colombia
South American Games medalists in cycling